INSO may refer to:
Iraqi National Symphony Orchestra
Indian National Students Organisation
Stellent, a software company (former name)